Pardosa drenskii is a wolf spider species in the genus Pardosa found in Bulgaria.

See also 
 List of Lycosidae species

References

External links 

drenskii
Spiders of Europe
Spiders described in 1968